Eric Lindholm may refer to:
Eric Lindholm (1890–1957), Swedish track and field athlete
Eric C. Lindholm, American music conductor